The Alan King Memorial is a darts tournament that has been held since 2005.

List of winners

Men's

Women's

References

Darts tournaments
Sports competitions in New Zealand
Recurring sporting events established in 1990
1990 establishments in New Zealand